Chana (Pattani Malay: จือเนาะ) is a district (amphoe) in the southeastern part of Songkhla province, southern Thailand.

Geography
Neighboring districts are (from the east clockwise): Thepha, Na Thawi, Sadao, Hat Yai, Na Mom, and Mueang Songkhla of Songkhla Province. To the northeast is the Gulf of Thailand.

History
Originally, Chana together with Palian, Thepha and Songkhla was one of four mueangs subordinate to Mueang Phatthalung. When Songkhla was split off from Phatthalung and made a direct subordinate of Bangkok, Chana was then placed under Songkhla.

The location of the town was moved several times, so when it was made a district in the thesaphiban administrative reforms at the beginning of the 20th century, the district office was in present-day Na Thawi. The location turned out to be inconvenient, so it was moved to Ban Na. In 1917 the district was renamed to Ban Na after the central tambon. In 1924 the name was changed back to Chana by the government to avoid confusion with the district Ban Na in Surat Thani Province and Ban Na in Nakhon Nayok Province.

Etymology
The name Chana is a Thai corruption of chenok, its original name in Malay.

Economy
On 7 May 2019, the Prayut Chan-o-cha-led government approved an 18.7 billion baht "Southern Economic Corridor", also known as the "Southern Economic Zone", centered on Chana District. The scheme envisions transforming 16,753 rai of agricultural land into industrial zones: a deep-sea port; light industry (4,253 rai); heavy industry (4,000 rai); four 3,700 megawatt power plants (4,000 rai); import/export infrastructure (2,000 rai); logistical infrastructure (2,000 rai); and recreational areas and accommodations (500 rai). The government claims the project will provide jobs for more than 100,000 people. Local people, noting the environmental issues created by the Eastern Economic Corridor, are mobilising to stop the project.

A parallel effort, also (confusingly) called the "Southern Economic Corridor", but not involving Songkhla Province, aims at development of high-speed rail linking Bangkok to Surat Thani province, a double-track rail link from Chumphon to Ranong, a deep-sea Ranong port, and a "Royal Coast" tourism cluster, involving Phetchaburi, Prachuap Khiri Khan, Chumphon, and Ranong provinces.

Administration

Central administration 
Chana is divided into 14 sub-districts (tambons), which are further subdivided into 139 administrative villages (mubans).

Local administration 
There are three sub-district municipalities (thesaban tambons) in the district:
 Chana consisting of parts of sub-district Ban Na.
 Ban Na consisting of parts of sub-district Ban Na.
 Na Thap consisting of sub-district Na Thap.

There are 12 sub-district administrative organizations (SAO) in the district:
 Pa Ching consisting of sub-district Pa Ching.
 Saphan Mai Kaen consisting of sub-district Saphan Mai Kaen.
 Sakom consisting of sub-district Sakom.
 Na Wa consisting of sub-district Na Wa.
 Nam Khao consisting of sub-district Nam Khao.
 Khun Tat Wai consisting of sub-district Khun Tat Wai.
 Tha Mo Sai consisting of sub-district Tha Mo Sai.
 Chanong consisting of sub-district Chanong.
 Khu consisting of sub-district Khu.
 Khae consisting of sub-district Khae.
 Khlong Pia consisting of sub-district Khlong Pia.
 Taling Chan consisting of sub-district Taling Chan.

References

External links
amphoe.com
http://www.chana-sk.go.th Website of district (Thai)

Districts of Songkhla province